Sar Ab-e Kushk (also Romanized as Sar Āb-e Kūshk) is a village in Mazul Rural District, in the Central District of Nishapur County, Razavi Khorasan Province, Iran. At the 2006 census, its population was 1,705, in 446 families.

References 

Populated places in Nishapur County